WKMY may refer to:

 WKMY (FM), a radio station (99.9 FM) licensed to serve Athol, Massachusetts, United States
 WRWX, a radio station (91.1 FM) licensed to serve Winchendon, Massachusetts, which held the call sign WKMY from 2005 to 2020
 WQTX, a radio station (92.1 FM) licensed to serve St. Johns, Michigan, United States, which held the call sign WKMY from 2005 to 2020
 WKOY-FM, a radio station (100.9 FM) licensed to serve Princeton, Virginia, United States, which held the call sign WKMY from 1981 to 1997